The men's 3000 metres at the 1999 Asian Winter Games was held on February 1, 1999 at Yongpyong Indoor Ice Rink, South Korea.

Schedule
All times are Korea Standard Time (UTC+09:00)

Results
Legend
ADV — Advanced
DSQ — Disqualified

Heats

Heat 1

Heat 2

Final

References

Heats
Finals

External links
Official website

Men 3000